Aphrodisiacs and Anti-aphrodisiacs: Three Essays on the Powers of Reproduction is a 1869/1873 book by John Davenport in which the author provides an account of sexual rituals and symbols.

Publication
John Camden Hotten prepared the book for the press.
Dragana Đorđević believes the book to be backdated and argues that it was in fact printed in 1873 because "custom of back-dating a new text was as common in this business as the practice of up-dating an old one." 100 copies were advertised but 250 were actually printed.

Reception
Steven Marcus regards it "with a certain amount of sympathy and respect."

References

External links 
 Aphrodisiacs and Anti-aphrodisiacs: Three Essays on the Powers of Reproduction

1869 non-fiction books
English-language books

Non-fiction books about sexuality